The Battle of Dug Springs, also known as the Rains Scare, was a battle that was a part of the Trans-Mississippi Theater of the American Civil War. It was fought on August 2, 1861, near Clever, Missouri.

The battle was fought between several Union companies under the command of  Nathaniel Lyon and Missouri State Guardsman supported by Confederate Regulars. The Union forces were led by Capt. Frederick Steele, the Fourth artillery under Lieutenant Lathrop, and a company of cavalry under Captain Stanley, and finally Totten's battery, with two pieces from Sigel's brigade. The Missouri Forces were led by Brig. Gen. James S. Rains and the Confederate support was made up of men from the 17th Arkansas Infantry Regiment commanded by Capt. Americus V. Reiff. Future Congressman Jordan E. Cravens, fought with Capt. Reiff's company.

Battle 
News reached the Brigadier General Nathaniel Lyon on August 1st that the Confederates were advancing on his force, in 3 columns, numbering 12,000 men. Gen. Nathaniel Lyon immediately led his 5,800 soldiers out of Springfield where they had been encamped. Lyon's force reached Dug Springs August 2nd. Confederate pickets encountered Lyon's advance force made up of four companies. The Southerners quickly retreated before Union artillery could be fired at them and rejoined an advance force led by Capt. Americus V. Reiff. Capt. Reiff's force of 120 men began to skirmish with Federal forces. Brigadier General Rains was encamped just South of Dug Springs with a 400 man advanced guard. Around 5 P.M. Rains started advancing his troops toward Dug Springs and starting fighting on the opposite side of the road from Reiff. The Federal troops held firm so Reiff sent an aide to Rains to coordinate an assault on the Federals. Reiff advanced his men and the Federals began to retreat but at the same time a portion of Company C, 1st U.S. Cavalry charged Reiff. The cavalry broke through Reiffs command. Reiff later recalled "the most gallant act I saw during the war." about the charge. Federal artillery began again causing the Missouri State Guardsman and Confederate Regulars to flee which resulted in a Union victory.

The battle served as an important milestone in what culminated in the Battle of Wilson's Creek.

See also 
 Battle of Wilson's Creek
 Missouri in the American Civil War
 Troop engagements of the American Civil War, 1861

References 

Battles of the American Civil War in Missouri
1861 in Missouri